Manjeet is a given name. Notable people with the name include:

Manjeet Chillar (born 1986), Indian professional kabaddi player
Manjeet Kaur (born 1982), Indian sprint athlete from Punjab who specializes in 400 metres
Manjeet Kullar, actress in Indian movies and television
Manjeet Maan, producer and director of Indian Punjab films
Manjeet Singh Ral (born 1985), known by the stage-name Manj Musik, Indian music composer, singer and film scorer
Manjeet Shrestha (born 1984), Nepalese cricketer
Manjeet Singh (cricketer) (born 1991), Indian first-class cricketer
Manjeet Singh (rower) (born 1988) represented India the Men's Lightweight Double Sculls at the 2008 and 2012 London Olympics

See also
Maneet
Manj (disambiguation)